Brian Werner is an American conservationist and the founder of the Tiger Missing Link Foundation and the Tiger Creek wildlife refuge. Werner participated in the first genetic study of tigers, published in Riding The Tiger (Cambridge University Press, 1999). Werner was involved with the first open heart surgery performed on a tiger. 

With his family, Brian Werner was featured internationally on the Animal Planet show Growing Up Tiger.

References

External links
Tiger Creek Wildlife Refuge

American conservationists
People from Norwood, Ohio
Living people
Activists from Ohio
Year of birth missing (living people)